Nilufar Chowdhury Moni is a Bangladesh Nationalist Party politician and the former Member of Bangladesh Parliament from a reserved seat.

Career
Moni was elected to parliament from reserved seat as a Bangladesh Nationalist Party candidate in 2009.

References

Bangladesh Nationalist Party politicians
Living people
Women members of the Jatiya Sangsad
9th Jatiya Sangsad members
21st-century Bangladeshi women politicians
21st-century Bangladeshi politicians
Year of birth missing (living people)